Christopher Michael Scott (born 3 May 1976) is a former Australian rules footballer in the Australian Football League (AFL) best known for being a dual premiership player with the Brisbane Lions in addition to a dual premiership coach at  in 2011 and 2022. 

He has been the coach of the Geelong Football Club from 2011.

Early Life
Scott along with his twin brother Brad was born in Melbourne, Victoria, Australia to parents Colin and Lynne. He attended St Kevin’s College, Toorak, Melbourne. Both were also proficient in cricket with Chris in year 11 playing in an APS premiership with St Kevin’s.

Chris Scott was picked by the Brisbane Bears in the 1993 AFL Draft with the 12th draft pick. Moving to Brisbane in Queensland as a 17-year-old he continued to study at St Kevin's College in Melbourne before completing year 12 at Brisbane Boys' College during his first year on Brisbane's list. Scott had to catch a taxi to training because he was too young to drive.

Playing career

Brisbane Bears
Scott made his AFL debut in 1994 with the Brisbane Bears, taking out the Norwich Rising Star award.

Scott became one of the AFL's toughest defensive players, using his strength to outmuscle opposing forwards. Along with his brother Brad, they were nicknamed the Kray brothers by some fans for their forceful and ruthless styles of play.

Scott played a total of 55 games and kicked a total of 23 goals for Brisbane Bears from 1994 until 1996.

Brisbane Lions
At the end of the 1996 season, following the merger of the Fitzroy Football Club and the Brisbane Bears, Chris Scott joined the newly formed Brisbane Lions.

During Brisbane Lions's three-peat era, Scott was part of a powerful backline also containing Mal Michael, Chris Johnson and Justin Leppitsch. He was a member of the 2001 and 2002 premiership sides, but did not play in the 2003 AFL Grand Final after being named an emergency.

He caused controversy in round 1 of 2005 when Scott, along with Mal Michael, crashed into St Kilda's Nick Riewoldt after Riewoldt chose to stay on the ground with a broken collarbone. In the same game Scott also had several teeth knocked out after receiving a back-handed fist from opponent Aaron Hamill.

Scott's later career was plagued with injuries. Brisbane's round 22, 2007 match against  on 1 September 2007 became his last, after he announced his retirement from his playing career a few days earlier on 28 August 2007.

Scott played a total of 160 games and kicked 56 goals for Brisbane Lions from 1997 until 2007.

Coaching career

Fremantle Football Club assistant coach (2008–2010)
In 2008, Scott joined Fremantle Football Club as an assistant coach under senior coach Mark Harvey.

Geelong Football Club senior coach (2011–present)
In 2010, Scott was a frontrunner for the Port Adelaide Football Club senior coaching position to replace the sacked Mark Williams but ultimately fell short and caretaker senior coach and former Port captain, Matthew Primus, was chosen by the selection committee to be the club's senior coach. The media speculated that Scott was considered the second best applicant by the selection committee. On 18 October 2010, it was officially announced by the Geelong Football Club that Scott would be their senior coach, following Mark Thompson's resignation at the end of the 2010 season.

Scott had a brilliant start to his AFL coaching career, with Geelong winning its first thirteen matches of the 2011 season. His thirteen wins in succession was the best start to a coaching career in almost 80 years. But this streak was broken in round 15, when the Cats went down to Essendon by four points. Scott coached Geelong to its third Grand Final in five years and became the first senior coach since Malcolm Blight in 1997 to win a premiership as a first-year club senior coach, when Geelong under Scott defeated  in the 2011 AFL Grand Final by a margin of 38 points, where the final score was Geelong 18.11 (119) to Collingwood 12.9 (81). He is also the youngest premiership coach since Alex Jesaulenko in 1979 to win a Grand Final.

In August 2014, Scott signed a two-year contract extension extending his tenure as senior coach of Geelong until the end of 2017.

In August 2018, Scott signed a four-year contract extension extending his tenure as senior coach of Geelong until the end of 2022.

In the 2020 season, which was significantly affected by the Covid-19 pandemic in Australia, Scott coached Geelong to the 2020 AFL Grand Final, but fell short and lost to Richmond by a margin of 31 points, where the final score was Richmond 12.9.(81) to Geelong 7.8.(50).

In the 2022 season, Scott coached Geelong to a premiership win in the 2022 AFL Grand Final, where Geelong under Scott defeated Sydney Swans by a margin of 81 points, where the final score was Geelong 20.13 (133) to Sydney Swans 8.4 (52), This made Scott a two-time premiership coach.

Statistics

Playing statistics

|-
| 1994 ||  || 22
| 19 || 9 || 6 || 193 || 88 || 281 || 66 || 27 || 0.5 || 0.3 || 10.2 || 4.6 || 14.8 || 3.5 || 1.4 || 1
|-
| 1995 ||  || 22
| 14 || 8 || 12 || 118 || 65 || 183 || 57 || 10 || 0.6 || 0.9 || 8.4 || 4.6 || 13.1 || 4.1 || 0.7 || 0
|-
| 1996 ||  || 22
| 22 || 6 || 8 || 199 || 110 || 309 || 62 || 33 || 0.3 || 0.4 || 9.0 || 5.0 || 14.0 || 2.8 || 1.5 || 0
|-
| 1997 ||  || 22
| 5 || 3 || 1 || 26 || 19 || 45 || 15 || 2 || 0.6 || 0.2 || 5.2 || 3.8 || 9.0 || 3.0 || 0.4 || 0
|-
| 1998 ||  || 22
| 21 || 14 || 8 || 296 || 156 || 452 || 100 || 45 || 0.7 || 0.4 || 14.1 || 7.4 || 21.5 || 4.8 || 2.1 || 1
|-
| 1999 ||  || 22
| 24 || 4 || 4 || 363 || 150 || 513 || 150 || 34 || 0.2 || 0.2 || 15.1 || 6.3 || 21.4 || 6.3 || 1.4 || 7
|-
| 2000 ||  || 22
| 21 || 7 || 5 || 274 || 135 || 409 || 137 || 48 || 0.3 || 0.2 || 13.0 || 6.4 || 19.5 || 6.5 || 2.3 || 0
|-
| scope=row bgcolor=F0E68C | 2001# ||  || 22
| 20 || 8 || 7 || 275 || 121 || 396 || 142 || 31 || 0.4 || 0.4 || 13.8 || 6.1 || 19.8 || 7.1 || 1.6 || 2
|-
| scope=row bgcolor=F0E68C | 2002# ||  || 22
| 22 || 5 || 3 || 260 || 130 || 390 || 134 || 30 || 0.2 || 0.1 || 11.8 || 5.9 || 17.7 || 6.1 || 1.4 || 3
|-
| 2003 ||  || 22
| 19 || 2 || 2 || 179 || 88 || 267 || 108 || 38 || 0.1 || 0.1 || 9.4 || 4.6 || 14.1 || 5.7 || 2.0 || 0
|-
| 2004 ||  || 22
| 13 || 3 || 1 || 106 || 52 || 158 || 49 || 25 || 0.2 || 0.1 || 8.2 || 4.0 || 12.2 || 3.8 || 1.9 || 0
|-
| 2005 ||  || 22
| 13 || 10 || 8 || 110 || 34 || 144 || 68 || 23 || 0.8 || 0.6 || 8.5 || 2.6 || 11.1 || 5.2 || 1.8 || 0
|-
| 2006 ||  || 22
| 0 || — || — || — || — || — || — || — || — || — || — || — || — || — || — || –
|-
| 2007 ||  || 22
| 2 || 0 || 0 || 8 || 8 || 16 || 6 || 5 || 0.0 || 0.0 || 4.0 || 4.0 || 8.0 || 3.0 || 2.5 || 0
|- class=sortbottom
! colspan=3 | Career
! 215 !! 79 !! 65 !! 2407 !! 1156 !! 3563 !! 1094 !! 351 !! 0.4 !! 0.3 !! 11.2 !! 5.4 !! 16.6 !! 5.1 !! 1.6 !! 14
|}

Coaching statistics
Updated to the end of the 2022 season.

|- style="background-color: #EAEAEA"
| scope=row bgcolor=F0E68C | 2011#
|
| 25 || 22 || 3 || 0 || 88.0% || 2 (1) || 17
|-
! scope="row" style="font-weight:normal"|2012
|
| 23 || 15 || 8 || 0 || 65.2% || 6 (7) || 18
|- style="background-color: #EAEAEA"
! scope="row" style="font-weight:normal"|2013
|
| 25 || 19 || 6 || 0 || 76.0% || 2 (3) || 18
|-
! scope="row" style="font-weight:normal"|2014
|
| 24 || 17 || 7 || 0 || 70.8% || 3 (5) || 18
|- style="background-color: #EAEAEA"
! scope="row" style="font-weight:normal"|2015
|
| 21 || 11 || 9 || 1 || 52.4% || 10 || 18
|-
! scope="row" style="font-weight:normal"|2016
|
| 24 || 18 || 6 || 0 || 75.0% || 2 (3) || 18
|- style="background-color: #EAEAEA"
! scope="row" style="font-weight:normal"|2017
|
| 25 || 16 || 8 || 1 || 64.0% || 2 (3) || 18
|-
! scope="row" style="font-weight:normal"|2018
|
| 23|| 13 || 10 || 0 || 56.5% || 8 (8) || 18
|- style="background-color: #EAEAEA"
! scope="row" style="font-weight:normal"|2019
|
| 25 || 17 || 8 || 0 || 68.0% || 1 (3) || 18
|-
! scope="row" style="font-weight:normal"|2020
|
| 21 || 14 || 7 || 0 || 66.7% || 4 (2) || 18
|- style="background-color: #EAEAEA"
! scope="row" style="font-weight:normal"|2021
|
| 25 || 17 || 8 || 0 || 68.0% || 3 (4) || 18
|- 
| scope=row bgcolor=F0E68C | 2022#
|
| 25 || 21 || 4 || 0 || 84.0% || 1 (1) || 18
|-
|- class="sortbottom"
! colspan=2| Career totals
! 286
! 200
! 84
! 2
! 70.3%
! colspan=2|
|}

Honours and achievements

Playing honours
Team
AFL premiership (Brisbane Lions): 2001, 2002
Individual
Merrett-Murray Medal (Brisbane Lions): 1998
Brisbane Lions vice-captain: 1999–2004
Norwich Rising Star award (later named the Ron Evans Medal): 1994
AFL Rising Star Nominee: 1994 (round 7)
Brisbane Lions - Most professional player: 1999
Brisbane Lions Team of the Decade: 2000–2010 (half-back flank)Coaching honoursTeamAFL premiership: 2011, 2022IndividualJock McHale Medal: 2011, 2022All-Australian: 2011, 2022Coach of the Australian international rules football team''' for the 2017 International Rules Series

Personal life

Scott's identical twin brother Brad Scott played alongside him at the Brisbane Lions and is the senior coach of Essendon. Chris is the older twin by a few minutes.

References

External links

Geelong Football Club Premiership coaches

Brisbane Lions players
Brisbane Lions Premiership players
Brisbane Bears players
1976 births
Living people
Identical twins
AFL Rising Star winners
Merrett–Murray Medal winners
People educated at Brisbane Boys' College
Geelong Football Club coaches
People educated at St Kevin's College, Melbourne
Eastern Ranges players
Australian rules footballers from Melbourne
Australian twins
Twin sportspeople
All-Australian coaches
Australia international rules football team coaches
Two-time VFL/AFL Premiership players
Two-time VFL/AFL Premiership coaches